Furuhata (written: 古畑 or 降旗) is a Japanese surname. Notable people with the surname include:

Koji Furuhata (born 1933), Japanese actor
, Japanese idol and singer
, Japanese model and actress
, Japanese film director

Japanese-language surnames